SS Abessinia, a German cargo ship, was built in 1900 by Palmers Shipbuilding & Iron Co. of Newcastle.  Constructed of steel and measuring 137.6m x 15.8m x 8.5m she was 5753 gross register tons and was equipped with a triple expansion engine & three boilers giving 642 horse power and a speed of 12  knots.  Owned by the Hamburg-America Line she was interned by Chile during the war and her machinery damaged by her crew.

Later she was surrendered to the Allied nations, repaired, and arrived at Hamburg on 3 August 1920. She left Hamburg for the UK,  in ballast, and was wrecked on 3 September 1921 on Knivestone, Farne Islands. Considered to be the largest wreck on the Farnes, she remains popular with divers and her broken bow section, anchor and chain lie to the west side of the Knivestone Reef.

References 

Shipwrecks in the North Sea
Shipwrecks of Northumberland
Wreck diving sites in the United Kingdom
Maritime incidents in 1921
Steamships of Germany
World War I merchant ships of Germany
1900 ships